Miedzno may refer to the following places:
Miedzno, Kuyavian-Pomeranian Voivodeship (north-central Poland)
Miedzno, Kościerzyna County in Pomeranian Voivodeship (north Poland)
Miedzno, Słupsk County in Pomeranian Voivodeship (north Poland)
Miedzno, West Pomeranian Voivodeship (north-west Poland)
Miedźno, Łódź Voivodeship (central Poland)
Miedźno, Silesian Voivodeship (south Poland)